Tafjord is a surname. Notable people with the surname include:

Ann Eli Tafjord (born 1976), Norwegian cross-country skier
Hild Sofie Tafjord (born 1974), Norwegian French horn player
Runar Tafjord (born 1957), Norwegian French horn player
Stein Erik Tafjord (born 1953), Norwegian jazz musician